The Women's 50m Backstroke event at the 10th FINA World Aquatics Championships swam on 23–24 July 2003 in Barcelona, Spain. Preliminary heats swam during the morning session on July 23, with the top-16 finishers advancing to Semifinals that evening. The top-8 finishers then advanced to swim again in the Final the next evening.

At the start of the event, the World (WR) and Championship (CR) records were:
WR: 28.25 swum by Sandra Völker (Germany) on June 17, 2000 in Berlin, Germany.
CR: 28.48 swum by Natalie Coughlin (USA) on July 23, 2001 in Fukuoka, Japan

Results

Final

Semifinals

Preliminaries

References

Swimming at the 2003 World Aquatics Championships
2003 in women's swimming